Heinrich 'Cooper' Smit (born 21 November 1990) is a rugby union winger who plays for  and Namibia.
Smit made his debut for the Namibia in 2013 and was part of the squad at the 2015 Rugby World Cup.

References

External links

Living people
1990 births
Namibian rugby union players
Namibia international rugby union players
Rugby union wings